North Dagon Township (also North Dagon Myothit) is located in the eastern part of Yangon, Myanmar. The township comprises 25 wards, and shares borders with East Dagon Township in the north and east, South Okkalapa township in the west, and South Dagon township in the south. North Dagon is a relatively more developed area among the new satellite towns founded in 1989 by the military government. The realestate price is also considered highest among other new satellite townships.

The township has 24 primary schools, one middle school and four high schools. Dagon University, the largest undergraduate university in the city, is located in the central part of the township.

North Dagon is connected to the mainland Yangon across the Pazundaung Creek by the four bridges Panglong Bridge, Ba Htoo Bridge, Baeli Bridge and the Yangon Circular Railway runs a rail service between Dagon University and downtown Yangon.

References

Townships of Yangon